Dropout Boogie is the eleventh studio album by American rock duo the Black Keys. It was released on May 13, 2022, by Easy Eye Sound and Nonesuch Records. The album was preceded by the release of two singles: the lead single "Wild Child", which was released on March 10, 2022, in conjunction with the album announcement, and "It Ain't Over", which was released on April 27, 2022.

Dropout Boogie received favorable reviews from music critics and was nominated for Best Rock Album at the 65th Annual Grammy Awards.

Background
Work for Dropout Boogie began in summer of 2021, which initially saw the Black Keys plan ideas for the album as a duo before recruiting multiple musicians to collaborate with them such as Greg Cartwright of Reigning Sound and Billy Gibbons of ZZ Top, the latter a longtime friend of the duo. The album was recorded at Dan Auerbach's Easy Eye Sound studio in Nashville, Tennessee.

Promotion

Singles
The album's lead single "Wild Child" was released on March 10, 2022. The song topped Billboards Adult Alternative Airplay chart. The second single from the album, "It Ain't Over", was released on April 27, 2022.

Tour
To promote the album, the Black Keys will embark on the Dropout Boogie Tour, which consisted of 32 dates across the United States with Band of Horses as a supporting act alongside Ceramic Animal, Early James, and the Velveteers as opening acts on select dates.

Critical reception

Upon release, Dropout Boogie received positive acclaim from critics. At Metacritic, which assigns a normalized score out of 100 based on reviews from mainstream publications, the album has a score of 73 based on 12 critical reviews, indicating "generally favorable reviews".

Track listing

Personnel
The Black Keys
 Dan Auerbach – vocals, bass, guitar, production (all tracks); synthesizer (1, 2, 6), Hammond organ (5)
 Patrick Carney – drums, production (all tracks); bass (1), guitar (1, 4), synthesizer (1–3, 6), percussion (2, 3, 5, 9)

Additional musicians
 Andy Gabbard – background vocals (1–3, 5–10), Wurlitzer (1), piano (7), guitar (5, 7)
 Sam Bacco – percussion (1–7, 9, 10)
 Ray Jacildo – Hammond organ (3, 6); harpsichord, piano (6)
 Sierra Ferrell – background vocals (4)
 Billy F Gibbons – featured guitar (5)

Technical
 Greg Calbi – mastering
 Steve Fallone – mastering
 Tchad Blake – mixing, editing
 Tom Elmhirst – mixing, editing
 Caleb VanBuskirk – engineering
 M. Allen Parker – engineering
 Jonny Ullman – engineering assistance
 McKinley James – engineering assistance
 Tyler Zwiep – engineering assistance

Imagery
 Perry Shall – design and layout
 Jim Herrington – photography

Charts

References

2022 albums
The Black Keys albums
Albums produced by Dan Auerbach
Albums produced by Patrick Carney
Nonesuch Records albums